Jack Gallagher (born June 27, 1947) is an American composer and college professor. His compositions include orchestral, chamber, piano and choral works. He has written two symphonies, both of which have been recorded.

Life and career
Gallagher was born in Brooklyn, New York to John J. and Ethel L. Schaffeld Gallagher and raised, until age six, in Glendale, Queens, New York. In 1953, he moved with his family to Plainview, New York, where he studied music in the public schools and, privately, accordion and trumpet. He earned the Bachelor of Arts degree cum laude from Hofstra University and Master of Fine Arts and Doctor of Musical Arts degrees from Cornell University.

Gallagher's principal composition teachers were Elie Siegmeister, Robert Palmer, and Burrill Phillips; his conducting teacher was Charles Gouse; his piano teachers were Lawrence Schubert, Malcolm Bilson and Noël Lee; his trumpet teachers included Charles Gouse and Allan Dean.  Gallagher is the Olive Williams Kettering Professor of Music at The College of Wooster in Wooster, Ohio, where he was appointed to the faculty in 1977. He was Music Director of the Wooster Symphony in 1985-86.

Performances, Recordings and Broadcasts

Gallagher's works have been performed or recorded by orchestras including the London Symphony Orchestra, Buffalo Philharmonic Orchestra, Virginia Symphony Orchestra, Omaha Symphony Orchestra, Charleston Symphony Orchestra, Cleveland Chamber Symphony, Polish Radio and Television Symphony Orchestra of Kraków, Kiev Philharmonic (National Philharmonic of Ukraine), Contemporary Youth Orchestra, and performers including the U.S. Air Force Band of Flight, pianists Angelin Chang and Frank Huang, Trio Terzetto, and former Cincinnati Symphony Orchestra Principal Trumpet Robert Sullivan. The Naxos recording titled Orchestral Music was awarded five-star reviews by Anthony Burton of BBC Music Magazine in 2010 and by Steven Ritter of Audiophile Audition online magazine in 2011. The recording of Symphony No. 2 ‘Ascendant’ also was awarded five stars by Audiophile Audition in March 2015.

Gallagher's print editions are published by Editions Bim (Vuarmarens, Switzerland), Kalmus Masters Music Publications, Lawson-Gould, Manduca Music, The Brass Press, and The Piano Teachers' Press. His compositions, included on eighteen published compact discs on the Naxos Records, Musical Heritage Society, Vienna Modern Masters, ERMMedia, Summit Records, Capstone Records Altissimo, Promuse and Beauport Classical labels, have been broadcast by more than 120 classical radio stations in the U.S., Canada, Australia, New Zealand, the United Kingdom, the Netherlands, and Vienna, Austria.

Gallagher has taught composition, orchestration, counterpoint, 20th-century music theory and, until 2012, trumpet at The College of Wooster since 1977. His composition students include 2013 International Alliance for Women in Music Ellen Taaffe Zwilich Prize-winner Cara Haxo, 2012 National Federation of Music Clubs Young Composers Award-winner Frederick Evans, 2011 McKnight Foundation Fellowship-winner Elizabeth Alexander, Michael Hennagin Prize-winner Christopher Palestrant, six-time ASCAP Morton Gould Young Composer Award-winner and 2009 Charles Ives Prize-winner awarded by the American Academy of Arts and Letters Ryan Gallagher, Marshall Scholarship-winner Rachel Kincaid, and S. Alexander Reed, Associate Professor of Music at Ithaca College and author of Assimilate: A Critical History of Industrial Music.

Gallagher's trumpet students include Amanda Bekeny, visiting trumpet teacher at Ohio State University from 2010-2012, John Schuesselin, Associate Professor of Trumpet at the University of Mississippi, Zachary Lyman, Associate Professor of Trumpet at Pacific Lutheran University, Brian McCreath, former Principal Trumpet, Milwaukee Ballet, Susan Sievert Messersmith of the Charleston Symphony Orchestra, Eric Knorr, Principal Trumpet of the Air Force Band of Flight, and Timothy McCoul of the Illinois Symphony Orchestra.

Personal life

Gallagher’s wife, April, taught at The College of Wooster, Ohio, Nursery School from 2000 to 2012; his daughter, Kelly, Pharm.D. from the University of Pittsburgh, is a clinical pharmacist at the University of Pittsburgh Medical Center; his son, Ryan, a graduate of The Juilliard School and Cornell University, is a composer and member of the visiting faculty at Southeast Missouri State University. Gallagher’s twin grandsons, Jack and Thomas, live in Pittsburgh, PA.

Compositions

Orchestral
Symphony No. 2 “Ascendant” (2010-2013)
Sinfonietta for string orchestra (1990/2008)
Quiet Reflections (1996)
The Persistence of Memory (In Memoriam: Brian Israel) (1995)
Symphony in One Movement: Threnody (1991)
Diversions Overture (1986)
Berceuse (1977)

Wind Ensemble
A Psalm of Life (1997/2008)
Proteus Rising from the Sea (1994)
The Persistence of Memory (In Memoriam: Brian Israel) (1989)
Diversions: Triptych for symphonic band (1985)
Mist-Covered Mountain (Fantasy for Symphonic Band on a Scottish Pipe Tune) (1982)

Choral
Dance No More (2005), for a cappella S.A.T.B. chorus
Springsong (2004), for S.S.A. chorus and piano
Song of the Daffodils (1998), for unison treble chorus and piano
To Those Who've Fail'd (1983), for a cappella S.A.T.B. chorus
Three Wordsworth Poems (1982), for S.A.T.B. chorus and piano
Elegy (1981), for a cappella S.A.T.B chorus
Invocation (1980), for a cappella S.A.T.B. chorus

Chamber
Danse Ancienne  (2011) for flute, viola and double bass
Remembrance of Robin (2008/2010) for trumpet in C and piano
Twin Spirits (2009) for two trumpets and piano
Intimations of Finzi (2004/2005) for clarinet and piano
Duo for Two Cellos (2004/2015)
Exotic Dances (1996) for violin and piano
Stanfare (1996) for eight trumpets and timpani
Heritage Music (1988) for violin, cello, piano and horn
Celebration and Reflection (1987) for brass quintet
Capriccio for Two Trumpets (1984)
Resonances (1983) for four trumpets
Variations for Cello and Piano (1973)
Ancient Evenings and Distant Music (1971) for woodwind quintet
Toccata for Brass Quintet (1970)

Vocal
Let Me Make Songs (2007), for soprano, trumpet and piano
Darest Thou Now, O Soul (1983), for soprano, cello and piano
Three Songs of Love, Joy and the Beauty of Night (1975), for high or low voice and piano

Solo
Aflame (2010), for viola
Malambo Nouveau (2000/2009), for piano
Sonata Breve (1981/99), for trumpet
Evening Music (1998), for piano
Six Pieces for Kelly (1989), for piano
Three Little Waltzes and Pastorale (1984), for piano
Sonata Breve (1981) for tuba
Sonata (1979), for trumpet
Six Bagatelles (1978), for piano
Happy Birthday, April (1976/2014), for piano
Nocturne (1976/2008), for piano
Sonatina (1976/2008), for piano
Sonata (1973/2008), for piano

Selected Discography

•Symphony No. 2 ‘Ascendant’ and Quiet Reflections, London Symphony Orchestra, JoAnn Falletta, conductor. Tim Handley, producer; Phillip Rowlands, engineer. Recorded at Blackheath Concert Halls, London, UK, September 2 & 3, 2013, Naxos compact disc 8.559768, January 2015.

•Jack Gallagher: Orchestral Music, London Symphony Orchestra, JoAnn Falletta, conductor. Michael Fine, producer; Wolf-Dieter Karwatky, engineer. Recorded at Abbey Road Studio One, London, UK, January 5 & 6 2009, Naxos compact disc 8.559652, 2010.

•Celebration and Reflection, Bala Brass, Revealed, Beauport Classics compact disc, BC 41420, 2014.

•Toccata for Brass Quintet, U.S. Air Force Heartland of America Brass Quintet, Kiss My Brass, Altissimo Recordings compact disc, 2011.

•Nocturne, Jeri-Mae Astolfi, pianist, Sonance: New Music for Piano, Capstone Records compact disc CPS-8777, 2007.

•Diversions Overture, Kiev Philharmonic, Robert Ian Winstin, conductor, Masterworks of the New Era,  vol. 7, ERMMedia compact disc ERM-6709, 2005.
	
•The Persistence of Memory (In Memoriam: Brian Israel), Ruse Philharmonic Orchestra, Bulgaria, Tsanko Delibozov, conductor, Vienna, Austria: Vienna Modern Masters compact disc VMM 3036, 1996.

•Proteus Rising from the Sea, Air Force Band of Flight, Lt. Col. Richard A. Shelton, Commander and Conductor, Images, U.S. Air Force compact disc, 1996.

•Berceuse, Polish Radio and Television Symphony Orchestra of Kraków, Szymon Kawalla, conductor. Vienna, Austria: Vienna Modern Masters compact disc VMM 3030, 1995.
	
•Symphony in One Movement: Threnody, Koszalin Philharmonic Orchestra, Szymon Kawalla, conductor. Vienna, Austria: Vienna Modern Masters compact disc VMM 3028, 1995.

•Toccata for Brass Quintet, U.S. Air Force Heartland of America Brass Quintet, Windswept, Altissimo Recordings, 2007.

•Ancient Evenings and Distant Music, Solaris Wind Quintet, American Quintets, Capstone Records compact disc CPS-8677, 2000.

•Toccata for Brass Quintet, Galliard Brass Ensemble, recorded at Hill Auditorium, University of Michigan. Ocean, New Jersey: Musical Heritage Society, Inc. compact disc MHS 513534T, 1994.

•Capriccio for Two Trumpets, Robert Sullivan and Ken DeCarlo, trumpets, Treasures for Trumpet, Summit Records DCD 319, 2002.

Selected Videos

•Symphony No. 2 ‘Ascendant’ movement II: “Playfully” (excerpt), London Symphony Orchestra, JoAnn Falletta, conductor, Blackheath Halls, London, September 2013

•Symphony No. 2 “Ascendant,” movement IV: “Slowly—Energetically” (excerpt), London Symphony Orchestra, JoAnn Falletta, conductor, Blackheath Halls, London, September 2013

•Symphony No. 2 “Ascendant,” movement IV: “Fast” (excerpt), London Symphony Orchestra, JoAnn Falletta, conductor, Blackheath Halls, London, September 2013

•Remembrance of Robin (part one), Robert Sullivan, trumpet, Julie Spangler, piano; Yamaha Artist Services, New York City, February 2010	
	
•Remembrance of Robin (part two), Robert Sullivan, trumpet, Julie Spangler, piano; Yamaha Artist Services, New York City, February 2010

Awards
2007: Producer for TNC Records' Grammy Award-winning recording of Olivier Messiaen’s Oiseaux exotiques
2005: College of Wooster Henry Luce III Award for Distinguished Scholarship
1999: Featured guest composer, 37th Annual Contemporary Music Festival, Sam Houston State University, Huntsville, Texas
1997: Exotic Dances for violin and piano nominated by editor of American Music magazine for the Pulitzer Prize in music
1996: Ohio Music Teachers Association "Composer of the Year"
1996: Composer Residency, Charles Ives Center for American Music
1995: Ohio Arts Council Individual Artist Fellowship
1988: Meet the Composer grant.
1987: First Prize, Virginia chapter, College Band Directors National Association Symposium for New Band Music.
1994: Associate Fellow, Atlantic Center for the Arts
1984: Composer Residency, the Yaddo Corporation
1983: Composer Residency, Virginia Center for the Creative Arts

References

External links
Official website
Biography at Naxos website
Interview with Jack Gallagher, August 6, 1988

1947 births
21st-century classical composers
Hofstra University alumni
Cornell University alumni
College of Wooster faculty
Living people
Musicians from Brooklyn
People from Plainview, New York
21st-century American musicians
Male classical composers
21st-century American male musicians